Stade de la Maladière was a multi-use stadium in Neuchâtel, Switzerland. It was initially used as the stadium of Neuchâtel Xamax matches.  It was replaced by the current Stade de la Maladière in 2005.  The capacity of the stadium was 25,500 spectators.

See also 
List of football stadiums in Switzerland

External links 
 Stadium information

Maladiere
1924 establishments in Switzerland
Sports venues completed in 1924
2007 disestablishments in Switzerland
20th-century architecture in Switzerland